The Forsythe Collection refers to a collection of railway and transport ephemera owned and curated by transport enthusiast Robert Forsythe and his wife, Fiona. The collection is extensive and includes materials in three public repositories. Of the material now in public ownership or curation, the largest collection is in the National Railway Museum at York's Search Engine Archive. The central theme of the collection is the ephemera of travel and transport, especially driven by the recognized concept of Grey Literature.

Origins

The Forsythe Collection (in a conscious manner) may well date back to the early 20th century. James Forsythe (1916-2004), the father of Robert Forsythe (1959-), had a cousin Colin McFarlane. Colin avidly took up the Edwardian craze of collecting postcards (in his case, of railways). As James Forsythe grew up traveling the British Empire, he was introduced to stamp collecting. Both of those historic collections remain part of the Forsythe Collection. When Robert Forsythe grew up in the Norfolk in the 1960's, his father was deeply involved in maritime heritage, notably as Chairman of the Norfolk Wherry Trust caring for the Wherry Albion. James Forsythe had boated on the Norfolk Broads since his childhood. Maps and transport literature surrounded Robert. At school, Robert Forsythe started to collect railway timetables in 1971, and the earliest letters establishing this collection survive at the Norfolk Record Office.

In time, Robert Forsythe became a museum curator and met and married a librarian, Fiona Forsythe. They built up a network of contributors and established, what the railway world realised was, a very special collection. Meanwhile, as house moves forced decisions, other elements of the family collections found public repositories. These embrace the Papers of Major James A. Forsythe, MBE (1916-2004), in the Norfolk Record Office and the Cambridge University Centre of South Asian Studies.

Transfer to National Railway Museum
The transfer to the National Railway Museum at York took place in January 2009, and again in January 2012. Some 100 metres of shelved material were transferred. The essence of the transfer was the grey literature elements of the Forsythe Collection of Transport and Travel ephemera as it is described at York. This means the publicity materials: timetables, leaflets, handbills and brochures but in general not ISBN covered items nor "books" including guidebooks. Posters, tickets and postcards were also not transferred, and these collections remain with the Forsythe's. Nor were extensive model railway interests. Subsequently, materials were used in the first APP generated at the museum. Another selective mention is of the material used in The Track Stars Exhibition in 2012.

References

Further reading
 The complete bibliography detailing as well as possible public usage of Forsythe Collection items.
 The background of Major J A Forsythe's involvement in maritime heritage.
 National Railway Museum  Press release on the occasion of purchase in 2009.
 Hexham Courant  Feature written at the time of the National Railway Museum purchase.
 Reverend John Davies reviews a visit to The Forsythe Collection at York.

Ephemera
British Rail
History of Norfolk